The Hamnet Players, founded in 1993, perform virtual theatre (cyberformance) using IRC chat.

Overview

On 12 December 1993, a dozen people gathered at an event which made cyber-history: an experimental performance on IRC–Internet Relay Chat of a parody of Shakespeare's Hamlet, irreverently renamed "Hamnet." Eighteen persons were to be performers; the rest had come to watch the show. The main source of the humour is playful juxtaposition of Shakespearean plot, characters and language. The Hamnet Players productions are not only experiments in virtual theatre, they are also carnivals of wordplay, chock-ful of wit and humour. "Hamlet" was a particular favorite in 19th Century American parodies. But there was something very new and unusual about this event. Performers didn't have to worry about their makeup or costumes, and it was more important for them to be able to type fast than to project their voices. The performance "took place" not in a real world theatre, but in a virtual auditorium, specially designated channel on IRC called #hamnet. After the name of the group engaged in this experiment in virtual theatre The Hamnet Players had its first production.

The Hamnet Players have had a remarkable amount of attention from conventional media from this emerging art form. But they are still playing to rather modest-sized intimate audiences. The group are not constantly performing together, they split then reconvene to perform other productions. In an off-the-record statement, one member of the company suggested that the cast would like to produce something by Samuel Beckett or Sam Shepard.

General history

The Hamnet Players were founded in 1993 by Stuart Harris, an Englishman living in San Diego, California, a former actor, computer professional and author of computer manuals. In December 1993 they debuted the concept of internet theatre with their debut production of "Hamnet", a parody of William Shakespeare's play "Hamlet", followed later in April 1994 with their second production of "PCbeth: an IBM clone of Macbeth,", another parody of a Shakespeare play, this time using "Macbeth". In February 1995 they moved away from Shakespeare and used the plot of the Tennessee Williams's play "A Streetcar Named Desire", to create their third original piece "An IRC Channel Named #desire". The Hamnet Players performances are a form of virtual theatre, first of all, because they are focused gatherings, just like face-to-face encounters. Although participants could not see one another and their bodies were not co-present to one another, they cooperated to sustain a single focus of attention, taking turns at talking.

The name "Hamnet Players" is rich in cultural resonances. A "ham" is "an ineffective or overemphatic actor, one who rants or overacts". Thus, besides being an obvious pun on "Hamlet", the expression invites association to "hamming it up on the Net"; behaving in an exaggerated, theatrical fashion while logged onto the Internet. Another meaning of "ham" is also pertinent, in that "ham radio", un-institutionalized mediated radio communication, run by amateurs, outside the formal broadcasting framework. Ham radio culture shares with hacker culture, as well as with Net culture. Another association is to a son of Shakespeare named Hamnet, who died at the age of 11 on August 11, 1596. Hamnet had been named after a friend of Shakespeare's, who was present at Shakespeare's funeral and was remembered in his will.

Stuart Harris
The founder of The Hamnet Players Stuart Harris, gained three years' experience as a semi-professional actor on the festival circuit, and two more as a professional in London and in provincial repertory theatre, with further experience as a director in television . Harris's unique background and combination of talents led him to recognize the dramatic and theatrical potential of IRC. In December 1993, Harris made use of the IRC by creating a chat channel named Hamnet, where actors and spectators met online.

What Harris was trying to create?

Since all participants in an IRC conversation may choose whatever nickname they wish to be known by and since an IRC channel may contain many people who contribute nothing, but merely watch, the elements of theatre are there: a cast of characters with names like Hamlet, Ophelia, and Polonius etc., can be convened and an audience invited to watch. Harris's irreverent spirit and love of wordplay, which both feature and flourish in all The Hamnet Players activities, are immediately evident in his email address and in his regular nickname on IRC.

The phrase "Hamnet Players" creates the impression that Harris intended to develop an online repertory company, and that such a company may have crystallized over time. This is not exactly the case, although some continuity from one script and performance to another was desirable. There has been considerable turnover from one performance to another. Although there have been a few "faithful’s", by and large, "fresh faces" turned up at succeeding performances. This was all to the good, as it happened, enhancing the prospects for surprising, creative improvisation. In a retrospective comment, with six performances behind him, Harris wrote:

Harris has many names for the activities of his group. On various occasions he has used "Internet Theatre," "participatory performance art forum," "an emerging art form," "a "romp," an "extravaganza," "an obscene pastiche," "virtual theater," and even "virtual reality drama".

Like classic farces, Hamnet scripts do away with psychological depth of characterization, reducing plots to such an extent that a mere shell of the main characters survives. We can even argue that the verbal frolics in Hamnet scripts and productions are the textual equivalent of wild physical slapstick.

The Hamnet Players influence

The Hamnet Players engaged in the first ever experiment in virtual theatre  The pioneering experiments in virtual theatre by the Hamnet players are an example of an effort to transfer all genres to a new medium, in this case the theatrical genre of parody, pastiche or farce, from the real world stage to the Internet. Therefore, they were experiments in virtual theatre, the seeming contradiction in terms, since both laypersons and professionals have generally thought of theatre as requiring physical co-presence of performer's and audience. There has been, and no doubt will continue to be a good deal of hype in the near future about the potential of the Internet to foster globalization and democratization of culture.

Past productions
 Hamnet, 1st production (12 December 1993)
 Hamnet, 2nd production (6 February 1994)
 PCBeth (an IBM clone of Macbeth), 1st production (23 April 1994)
 PCBeth (an IBM clone of Macbeth), 2nd production (10 July 1994)
 An IRC channel named #desire, 1st production (30 October 1994)
 An IRC channel named #desire, 2nd production (12 February 1995)

Hamnet

The world premiere of Hamnet opened to audiences on 12 December 1993 at 20:25 universal time, on channel #hamnet.

The play consisted of 80 lines, it had a cast of 19 and crew of 4. The lead role of Hamlet was played by "El_lngles" from San Diego, not only was he the lead he also wrote it directed and produced it, also the leading lady Ophelia was played by "Karen" from Fairbanks, Alaska, This show was such a huge hit it made a second performance 3 months later on 6 February 1994.

PCBeth (an IBM clone of Macbeth)

"PCBeth" was The Hamnet Players second production, which was premiered on 23 April 1994, which would have been Shakespeare's 430th birthday. The production was a 160-line pastiche which pioneered the use of virtual images in the form of JPEG files. The images were offered by the producers for those who had the ability to receive and display them. PCBeth was re-staged on 10 July 1994, as a 'festival' production. This second production had some VIP stars and audio effects.

The first production had 21 members of cast and crew, who were based all across the world ranging from London, UK, to Tel Aviv, and South Africa. The starring roles of "PCBeth" and "LadyM" were played by "Gazza" based in Bath, Somerset, and "Fem" who was based in Fairbanks. The plot line had been preserved, however the text had been modernised to keep the modern audience engaged. The second production had 15 members of cast and crew. Again, for this production, the cast and crew were based all across the globe from Vancouver to Jerusalem. The lead role of "PCBeth" was played by "Cubby" based in Vancouver and LadyM was played by "AlmaW" based in Lexington, Virginia.

An IRC channel named #desire

"An IRC channel named #desire" was the 3rd performance produced by The Hamnet Players. It was performed twice, once in October 1994 and again in February 1995. The performances consisted of 28 members of cast and crew. The three starring roles were played by, Heather Wagner, who played Blanche, Gayle Kidder, who played Stella, and Gary 'Gazza' Hunt, who played 'Big Slob Stanley'. As with all the performances which The Hamnet players have produced, all of the cast and crew were based all across the world during the performance, with the three main cast members being located in Bath, New York City and San Diego.

For this performance The Hamnet Players moved away from Shakespeare for the first time, and this time used the Tennessee Williams play 'A Streetcar Named Desire', as the plot basis for their performance.

Creative process
Harris worked out most of the details himself; to start with all performances were completed in GMT (Greenwich Mean Time). He used two different strategies to cast the various roles. For the performances of "Hamnet," Harris tried to do all casting more or less at the last minute, inviting all, ahead of time, to convene in the #hamnet channel several hours before performance time. During preparations online, he loaded what he called his"/pora" file, which asked the users to select whether they would like to be audience (a) or performers (p).

This system proved too slow, and with the performances of "PCbeth," Harris switched to pre-casting at least the major roles a few days ahead.To maintain as much spontaneity as possible, he generally sent people only their own lines by email, not the entire script.

To get into "costume" all the players had to do was change their nicks. Thus in the February 1994 performance of "Hamnet," in his guise as <Producer> Harris typed:

When creating the Hamnet players on IRC he added roles he found to be useful for staging in IRC: exit, drums, Col-ors, prompter and audience. The actors are not the only ones who play around, improvise, and raise a textual ruckus, members of the audience do to. Technically, all that is necessary for "audience" to be represented on screen is for one person to use the nickname <audience> and type "clap, clap, clap ...," as line 1 of a script calls for, and to comment "hmm....." at the end [line 80].

Harris explicitly composed the reaction of the audience. He chose very traditional places for this feedback: the character named audience has a line at the beginning and at the end of it. With this inclusion he made certain that all dimensions, as meyerhold called them, were included in his performance: in addition to author, producer, director and players. Harris had an audience as well, he was conscious of the fact nobody can predict how the performance would be perceived by the spectators, or even if there would be any spectator's presence, and to what extent his audience would be accustomed to the conventions of an IRC channel. Harris gained publicity for this event in many ways, such as an announcement on USENET newsgroups and three appearances on American National Public Radio, local television interviews and newspaper coverage, and he tried to make this event public for IRC users.

Harris did not try to prevent negative behaviour found on IRC channels. He allowed this way had to be included in his idea of Theatre performance in this environment. He even wrote lines in his script similar to the language that is used in an IRC chat. But he was also concerned about telling a part of the audience how to behave and react in certain moments. This idea saved a clever guideline to guarantee audience interaction, including at least some of the response that is necessary for a Theatre performance. However, he did receive a genuine, positive response to his work from an audience who had no premade script in front of them.

Language of the performances

The Hamnet Players activities were performances in two distinct but complementary senses. First, they were scheduled, programmed events, whose centrepiece was the theatre-like performances of a script. There were roles, cues, "sets", and a plot to be realized from beginning to end. The pieces also had a producer, director and stage manager to keep things in hand, which are all components we associate with conventional theatre. The style of the performance means that there is not so much "acting" happening on the screen, but more pieces the different parts of the script coming together.

The most obvious contrast between "Hament" scripts and that of Shakespeares' was the archaic literary language of the Renaissance English from Shakespeare's original plays, and the colloquial, often slang, register of contemporary Anglo-American English. The "Hamnet" scripts contained, not only parts for leading characters, but also for "Enter", "Exit", "Prologue", "Scene", and even inanimate objects like "Drums" and "Colours". Among these "textual" roles, that of "Prologue," at least, was not entirely Harris’s invention. The script includes these "roles" because the players actually perform, not only the play but the text as well. When all actors perform their lines, they recreate the text online. One of the characters in the play-within-a-play in the original "Hamlet" is also called "Prologue." Due to the nature of the online IRC performance, the number of named characters in "Hamnet" is greatly smaller to the original number in the Shakespeare play. There were only 7 named characters "Hamnet" whereas there were 8 more in the original. Some characters are limited to one or two lines, for example "Polonius" is reduced to a single death cry.

The "PCbeth" script was mainly rewritten in IRC-ese and contemporary colloquial English. Only rarely did Gayle Kidder, the writer, contrast the original with contemporary language, as in:

Both the "Hamlet" and "Macbeth" parodies relayed by The Hamnet Players, spoofed, IRC, email, and other Internet conventions and practices. A striking example in "Hamnet" was the line:

Instead of "get thee to a nunnery", Hamlet is made to tell Ophelia to join an IRC channel named #nunnery. The script cites the IRC command/join. Ordinarily, the slash is necessary to activate the command online; here, of course its only function is to make a joke.

In Scene 1 of "PCbeth", PCbeth and Banquo enter, "armoured for KICK/BAN/DE-OP wars." Their wars are fought with three IRC commands; /kick removes a person temporarily from a channel, /ban prevents him or her from returning and de-op is a variant of the notion chanop or "channel operator", which is a person given certain privileges in managing a channel. To de-op someone is to deprive them of these privileges.

The players often cited snippets from plays other than the one being performed. Therefore, in the first performance of "Hamnet" (gazza), popped in during the preparations, and announced that he would have to sign off, drive home from university, and then log on again. His execution of the sign off command in IRC appeared on the screen as follows:

Citing the most famous line in Richard III was a humorous way to comment on his need to go home. Another variation is to pretend to be a character from another Shakespearean play. For instance, during December preparations for "Hamnet" someone suddenly changed their nick from <Spectator> to <MacBeth>. The move did not go unnoticed:

Style of performance

Every performance which The Hamnet Players produce uses Internet Relay Chat (IRC) software and worldwide links. Each line of the full script is numbered in sequence. After casting, actors are given their own lines and cues by email, and no rehearsal is allowed. This ensures that it is only the production team that knows how the performance will unfold when presented in IRC. In previous productions inventive performers, delivering their lines via keyboard, have found ways of not only suggesting theatrical emotion, but adapting also their lines.

The Hamnet Players were of the first groups to challenge the conventional dichotomy between "live" and "mediated" performances. The Hamnet Players performances shared most of the characteristics that an acclaimed practitioner, Richard Schechner ascribes to "live unmediated performance", as is attested by this public relations statement prepared by Stuart Harris:

The Hamnet Players performances were characterized by contingency and suspense. The challenge to maintain the focus online may be greater than in a conventional theatre space, but perhaps not more so than in outdoor theatre. Two main factors foster, this sense of contingency, the vulnerability of the technology to breakdown, evident in Harris’s comments, and the distractions of other conversations, of people "coming and going."

See also
 Internet Relay Chat
 Cyberformance
 Stuart Harris
 William Shakespeare

References

External links
 The Hamnet Players website
 The hamnet script
 Wiley online library, Curtain Time 20:00 GMT: Experiments with Virtual Theater on Internet Relay Chat
 The Internet as a Dramatic Medium
 Google document
 Presence in Front of the Fourth Wall of Cyberspace
 Hamming it up on the Net by Brenda Danet
 About Internet theatre & the Hamnet Players

Organizations established in 1993
Theatre companies
Internet Relay Chat